For Pete's Sake! is a 1934 Our Gang short comedy film directed by Gus Meins. It was the 127th (39th talking episode) Our Gang short that was released.

Plot
After Wally fills little Marianne's favorite doll with sawdust and gives it to her, neighborhood bully Leonard lassos it with a rope and swings it out in the street, where a passing truck crushes it. The gang then promises to purchase a new doll for the brokenhearted girl, as her big sister Jane comforts her.

Unfortunately, the kids have no money; but it doesn't dampen their spirits. They window shop for a doll at the local toy store, where Leonard's equally obnoxious father, who coincidentally owns the store, agrees to give the kids a doll if they will trade their beloved Pete the Pup for it. Balking at this proposition, the kids concoct a variety of moneymaking schemes, all of them doomed to failure. Tearfully, the gang surrenders and trades Pete for the doll. Pete does major damage to the store seconds later, and Leonard's father grabs the doll back, claiming compensation for damage to his store. But Pete's continued destruction convinces him to give the doll and the dog back to the gang. They then take the doll to a happy Marianne.

Cast

The Gang
 Wally Albright as Wally
 Matthew Beard as Stymie
 Scotty Beckett as Scotty
 Tommy Bond as Tommy
 George McFarland as Spanky
 Carlena Beard as Stymie's sister
 Marianne Edwards as Marianne
 Jacqueline Taylor as Jane
 Edmund Corthell as Our Gang member
 Barbara Goodrich as Our Gang member
 Philbrook Lyons as Our Gang member
 Billie Thomas, uncredited, as an unnamed Our Gang member
 Pete the Pup as himself

Additional cast
 Leonard Kibrick as Leonard
 Fred Holmes as Fred
 Lyle Tayo as Fred's Wife
 William Wagner as Storekeeper

See also
 Our Gang filmography

References

External links

1934 films
1934 comedy films
American black-and-white films
Films directed by Gus Meins
Hal Roach Studios short films
Our Gang films
1934 short films
1930s American films